Nellikode Bhaskaran  (21 April 1924 – 11 August 1988) was an Indian actor in Malayalam movies. His real name was Bhaskara Menon. He mostly played character roles and supporting roles.

Awards

Kerala State Film Awards:

Second Best Actor - 1972 - Maram
Second Best Actor - 1979 - Sarapancharam

Filmography

References

External links

Nellikkodu Bhaskaran at MSI

1924 births
1988 deaths
20th-century Indian male actors
Male actors from Kozhikode
Male actors in Malayalam cinema
Indian male film actors
Kerala State Film Award winners